This article summarizes the classes of discrete symmetry groups of the Euclidean plane. The symmetry groups are named here by three naming schemes: International notation, orbifold notation, and Coxeter notation.
There are three kinds of symmetry groups of the plane:
2 families of rosette groups – 2D point groups
7 frieze groups – 2D line groups
17 wallpaper groups – 2D space groups.

Rosette groups 
There are two families of discrete two-dimensional point groups, and they are specified with parameter n, which is the order of the group of the rotations in the group.

Frieze groups 
The 7 frieze groups, the two-dimensional line groups, with a direction of periodicity are given with five notational names. The Schönflies notation is given as infinite limits of 7 dihedral groups. The yellow regions represent the infinite fundamental domain in each.

Wallpaper groups 
The 17 wallpaper groups, with finite fundamental domains, are given by International notation, orbifold notation, and Coxeter notation, classified by the 5 Bravais lattices in the plane: square, oblique (parallelogrammatic), hexagonal (equilateral triangular), rectangular (centered rhombic), and rhombic (centered rectangular).

The p1 and p2 groups, with no reflectional symmetry, are repeated in all classes. The related pure reflectional Coxeter group are given with all classes except oblique.

Wallpaper subgroup relationships

See also
List of spherical symmetry groups
Orbifold notation#Hyperbolic plane - Hyperbolic symmetry groups

Notes

References 
 The Symmetries of Things 2008, John H. Conway, Heidi Burgiel, Chaim Goodman-Strauss,  (Orbifold notation for polyhedra, Euclidean and hyperbolic tilings)
 On Quaternions and Octonions, 2003, John Horton Conway and Derek A. Smith 
 Kaleidoscopes: Selected Writings of H. S. M. Coxeter, edited by F. Arthur Sherk, Peter McMullen, Anthony C. Thompson, Asia Ivic Weiss, Wiley-Interscience Publication, 1995,  
 (Paper 22) H.S.M. Coxeter, Regular and Semi Regular Polytopes I, [Math. Zeit. 46 (1940) 380–407, MR 2,10]
 (Paper 23) H.S.M. Coxeter, Regular and Semi-Regular Polytopes II, [Math. Zeit. 188 (1985) 559–591]
 (Paper 24) H.S.M. Coxeter, Regular and Semi-Regular Polytopes III, [Math. Zeit. 200 (1988) 3–45]

N. W. Johnson: Geometries and Transformations, (2018)  Chapter 12: Euclidean Symmetry Groups

External links 
 "Conway's manuscript" on Orbifold notation (Notation changed from this original, x is now used in place of open-dot, and o is used in place of the closed dot)
 The 17 Wallpaper Groups

Euclidean symmetries
Mathematics-related lists